Michael L. Wallace (born September 3, 1963) is a Canadian politician. He successfully stood for councillor in Burlington, Ontario in 1994 and was re-elected three times. He has represented the electoral district of Burlington from 2006 to 2015 in the House of Commons of Canada as a member of the Conservative Party of Canada. While there, he chaired the  Standing Committee on Justice and Human Rights and the Conservative Marine Caucus. He was defeated in the 2015 general election by Karina Gould.

Councillor
Born in Brockville, Ontario, Wallace was first elected to Burlington City Council in the fall of 1994, representing the southeast area of Burlington, now Ward 5. He was re-elected in 1997, 2000, and 2003. Before running for councillor, Wallace graduated from the University of Guelph, majoring in political science.

Wallace was nominated as the candidate for the newly formed Conservative Party for the 2004 federal election, running against long-time Liberal incumbent Paddy Torsney. A resurgence in the Liberal support across Ontario resulted in a 4,000-vote victory for Torsney.

Wallace did not resign as councillor for the 2004 federal election and continued to represent Ward 5.

Conservative MP
Mike Wallace represented Burlington in the House of Commons of Canada.

Wallace is a graduate of the University of Guelph, and majored in Political Science. He moved to Burlington with his wife Caroline in 1987 with his two daughters, Ashley and Lindsay. He was elected to Burlington City Council in 1994, re-elected in 1997, 2000 and 2003 then elected as the federal MP for Burlington in 2006. He was re-elected in 2008 and 2011 before being defeated by Karina Gould in 2015.

Wallace's work on the Hill included being the Chair of the Standing Committee on Justice and Human Rights. He also chaired the Conservative Marine Caucus and was part of the inter-party Steel Caucus. Wallace was also on the executive of the Canada Japan Parliamentary Association as well as on the board of the Canada Ukraine Friendship group.

He ran for reelection in 2015 and was defeated by Karina Gould.

Electoral record

References

External links
 Mike Wallace MP website
 

1963 births
Burlington, Ontario city councillors
Conservative Party of Canada MPs
Living people
Members of the House of Commons of Canada from Ontario
Ontario municipal councillors
People from Brockville
University of Guelph alumni
21st-century Canadian politicians